

See also
 Augustan poetry

Decades and years

 01
Poetry by century